Aleksandr Aleksandrovich Petukhov (born 25 April 1980) is a Russian former professional football player.

Club career
He made his debut in the Russian Premier League in 1999 for FC Zenit St. Petersburg.

Petukhov played for FC Metallurg Lipetsk in the Russian First Division and Russian Second Division from 2002 until 2005.

International career
In his only game for Russia national under-21 football team against Ukraine on 9 October 1999, Petukhov was a part of a very rare four-players substitution chain. Magomed Adiyev was substituted at half-time by Sergei Osipov, who then was substituted by Petukhov with 13 minutes left in the game due to injury, and then Petukhov was substituted himself 11 minutes later, as coach Leonid Pakhomov was trying to run out the clock and used the substitution on Petukhov as he was the youngest player in the game. Pakhomov apologized to Petukhov for substituting him.

Honours
 Russian Premier League bronze: 2001.
 Russian Cup winner: 1999.
 Russian Second Division Zone Center top scorer: 2002 (32 goals).

European club competitions
 UEFA Cup 1999–2000 with FC Zenit St. Petersburg: 2 games.
 UEFA Intertoto Cup 2000 with FC Zenit St. Petersburg: 3 games, 1 goal.

References

1980 births
Footballers from Saint Petersburg
Living people
Russian footballers
Russia under-21 international footballers
FC Zenit Saint Petersburg players
FC Luch Vladivostok players
Russian expatriate footballers
FC Tobol players
Expatriate footballers in Kazakhstan
Russian Premier League players
FC Metallurg Lipetsk players
Russian expatriate sportspeople in Kazakhstan
FC Tosno players
FC Dynamo Saint Petersburg players
FC Tekstilshchik Ivanovo players
Association football forwards
FC Sever Murmansk players